Ma Hai Long also known as Ma Hailong, (born 4 September 2003) is a Snooker player from China. In February 2023, he won the 2023 World Snooker Federation Championship, and with it earned a two-year card on the World Snooker Tour.

Early life
At the age of thirteen, Ma Hai Long took six months out of school in order to travel the 1000 miles from his home to train at the CBSA World Snooker Academy in Beijing.

Career
In January 2023, at the Guangzhou Snooker Championship, Ma Hailong defeated Jiang Jun in the final to win the championship.

In February 2023 Ma Hai Long defeated Stan Moody in the final of the WSF Championship in Sydney, Australia where the win secured him the offer of a two-year card on the World Snooker Tour. On the way to victory in the tournament he defeated Liu Hongyu  and former professional Gao Yang. It was his first overseas tournament outside of China. Previously a student at the CBSA Academy branch in Guangdong, after his win it was reported he was planning to move to the United Kingdom to be managed by Bobby Lee and Elite Sports Management.

He entered into the invitational 2023 Six-red World Championship held in Pathum Thani, Thailand in March 2023.

References

Living people
Chinese snooker players
Year of birth unknown
21st-century Chinese people